Billy Peden is an Australian former rugby league footballer who played in the 1990s and 2000s. He played in Australasia's National Rugby League for the Newcastle Knights (winning the 1997 and 2001 premierships with them) and in the Super League for the London Broncos.

Background
Peden was born in Cessnock, New South Wales.

Playing career
Peden played in the 1997 ARL grand final victory over Manly-Warringah which was the club's first premiership.  The game is remembered for Darren Albert scoring under the posts in the final 10 seconds of the game after receiving an inside ball from Andrew Johns.  

Having won the 2001 NRL Premiership, the Knights traveled to England to play the 2002 World Club Challenge against Super League champions, the Bradford Bulls.

In 2011, Peden spoke at the Once-A-Knight Old Boys grand final lunch about the 2001 grand final saying ‘"In 1997 it was special because it was the first one ... and all the emotion involved with that, but 2001 had its own emotions attached to it in terms of being a unified premiership and we were challenged on the fact that 1997 wasn’t. "I was lucky to have played in two great sides. You look at the blokes sitting here today and you have to pinch yourself to think you actually played with those blokes, so I was very blessed".

Post playing
Peden is now the Head Strength and Conditioning Coach at Harlequins RL. He signed a three-year deal to work under Brian McDermott at the London club.

Peden made his film début as an extra in the closing scenes of the 1988 Yahoo Serious film Young Einstein.

Peden is a former car mechanic. Peden has also had a coaching role with his former club Newcastle Knights.

In 2011, the Cessnock club's centenary year, Peden was named on the bench in a Cessnock 'Team of the Century'.

References

External links
 
NRL stats

1970 births
Living people
Australian rugby league players
Cessnock Goannas players
London Broncos players
Newcastle Knights captains
Newcastle Knights players
Rugby league locks
Rugby league players from Cessnock, New South Wales